The Ministry of Energy and Power Development is a government ministry, responsible for energy and electricity in Zimbabwe. The incumbent minister is Ambassador Joram Gumbo. It oversees:
 Zimbabwe Electricity Supply Authority
 Zimbabwe Energy Regulatory Authority

References

Government of Zimbabwe
Energy in Zimbabwe
Zimbabwe